Retarder  is The Unband's first major label release.

In Brief
"Every number is a testament to the might and stamina of the power chord."
-Las Vegas Weekly

"They have the amusing habit -- check out "Ski Hat," "Dope (Part 2)," and especially "$#@?!!"—of riffing straight through what would usually be a song's first couple of verses, throwing in a few lines of debauched lyrics, then cutting the whole thing off around the two-minute mark. It's these controlled doses of alcoholic incoherency, along with more traditional barn burners like "Too Much Is Never Enough," that make Retarder a keeper."
-The Boston Phoenix

Track listing
  	Geez Louise  	3:24  	   	
 	Too Much Is Never Enough 	2:35 		
 	Rock Hard 	3:41 		
 	Jilt 	3:00 		
 	Ski Hat 	2:09 		
 	$#@?!! 	2:14 		 
 	Pink Slip 	3:00 		 
 	Crack Soundtrack 	3:44 		 
 	Everybody Wants You 	4:09 		 
 	Get With You 	2:54 		 
 	(Sure Do Feel Like A) Piece of Shit 	3:06 		 
 	Dope, Pt. 2 	2:42 		 
 	Cocaine Whore 	2:43 		 
 	Drink and Rock 	3:28

Credits
Eugene Ferrari – drums
Matt Pierce – guitar, vocals
Mike Ruffino – bass, piano, organ, guitar, background vocals

Mark Alan Miller – engineer
Jon Marshall Smith – engineer
Kevin Shirley – mixing
Rich Alvy – engineer, mixing engineer
Leon Zervos – mastering

Trivia

"Geez Louise" was featured on The Wildhearts' covers album Stop Us If You've Heard This One Before Vol 1. as well as on the 2001 soundtrack to Broken Lizard's Super Troopers.

2000 albums
The Unband albums